Ramberg may refer to places in:

Places

Germany
 Ramberg (Harz), a hill in Saxony-Anhalt
 Ramberg, a borough of Bergen, Upper Bavaria
 Ramberg, Rhineland-Palatinate, a village in Rhineland-Palatinate

Norway
 Ramberg, Aust-Agder, a village in Risør Municipality in Aust-Agder county
 Ramberg, Bø, a village in Bø Municipality in Nordland county
 Ramberg, Flakstad, a village in Flakstad Municipality in Nordland county
 Ramberg, Telemark, a village in Notodden Municipality in Telemark county
 Ramberg, Vestvågøy, a small village in Vestvågøy Municipality in Nordland county

People
 Ramberg (surname), a list of people with the surname Ramberg

Other
 Ramberg–Osgood relationship, a mathematical equation
 Ramberg–Bäcklund reaction, a chemical reaction